The First Bad Man is an American animated cartoon directed by Tex Avery, and features narration by singing cowboy Tex Ritter. It was released by MGM on September 30, 1955.

Plot
An unnamed narrator tells a story about the history of Texas set one million years ago, when Dinosaur Dan, the eponymous villain, terrorized the state. He rustles all the cattle (brontosaurs with the heads of Texas longhorns), and runs off with all the pretty women. The primitive Texans finally corner Dan in his mountain hideout, and cleverly chisel away the outer rock, leaving behind a small rock jail with Dan inside. The final scene shows the jail still standing in modern-day Dallas, and reveals that the narrator is really Dinosaur Dan, still in jail and sadly asking: "When are y'all gonna let me out of here?"

Notes
Ed Benedict provided uncredited layout designs for this cartoon. Benedict would later work for Hanna-Barbera Studios (which was started by MGM alumni William Hanna and Joseph Barbera), where he would use some of the caveman designs from this cartoon as the basis for characters in The Flintstones.
The Wacky World of Tex Avery used this short as the primary inspiration for Einstone, one of the show's characters.

References

External links

Films directed by Tex Avery
Metro-Goldwyn-Mayer animated short films
1955 animated films
1955 short films
1955 films
1950s American animated films
1950s animated short films
Metro-Goldwyn-Mayer films
Films scored by Scott Bradley
Films with screenplays by Henry Wilson Allen
Films set in Texas
Animated films set in prehistory
Films produced by Fred Quimby
Films about cavemen
Animated films about cavemen
Metro-Goldwyn-Mayer cartoon studio short films
Apatosaurinae
1950s English-language films